= Crow's First Lesson =

"Crow's First Lesson" is a poem written by Ted Hughes in 1970.
